Achilles Heel may refer to:

 Achilles' heel, a metaphor for a fatal weakness in spite of overall strength
 Achilles Heel (album), music by Pedro the Lion
 Achilles Heel (hill), off Antarctica
 "Achilles' heel", narrative of fatal wound to warrior Achilles
 "Achilles Heel", a single by Toploader, originally released in 1999 and re-released in 2000
 "Achilles Heel" (Homeland), an episode of the TV series Homeland

See also 
 Achilles tendon